John Henry Lienhard IV (born 1930) is Professor Emeritus of mechanical engineering and history at The University of Houston. He worked in heat transfer and thermodynamics for many years prior to creating the radio program The Engines of Our Ingenuity.  Lienhard is a member of the US National Academy of Engineering.

Childhood and education

Lienhard was born in St. Paul, Minnesota in 1930.  Lienhard's father, John H. Lienhard III, served in Europe during World War I as a pilot for the United States Army then became a journalist for the St. Paul Dispatch and later a surveyor in Oregon. His mother, Catherine Lienhard (née Henderson), was an accomplished pianist and singer. One of his great-grandfathers was the Swiss pioneer Heinrich Lienhard, and another was the abolitionist, newspaper editor, and Minnesota state legislator Charles Augustus Wheaton. His family moved to Roseburg, Oregon when Lienhard was in his teens.

Lienhard had dyslexia as a child. He overcame this disability, finishing high school in 1947 and graduating from Multnomah College with an associate degree in 1949. He then received a BS degree from the Oregon State College (1951), after which he worked for the Boeing Airplane Co. in Seattle, Washington. He continued his studies in mechanical engineering, earning his MS degree from the University of Washington (1953) before being drafted into the US Army. While in the Army, he served at the Signal Corps Laboratories in Fort Monmouth, New Jersey. He received his PhD at the University of California in 1961.

Lienhard has been married to his wife Carol Ann Bratton since 1959.  They have two sons, John H. Lienhard V and Andrew J. Lienhard.

Career
Upon his discharge from the Army, Lienhard returned to the University of Washington to teach mechanical engineering.  He moved to the University of California at Berkeley in 1956 to serve as an engineering instructor, and to complete his PhD. After Berkeley, Lienhard was an associate professor at Washington State University from 1961–1967. He then moved to the University of Kentucky, where he was a professor from 1967–1980. In 1980, he moved to the University of Houston, where he is the M.D. Anderson Professor of Technology and Culture, emeritus.

Lienhard's engineering research centered on heat transfer with phase change.  His work encompassed film boiling,  
liquid jets, condensation (with his student Vijay K. Dhir), 
critical heat flux in various pool-boiling configurations, 
spinodal limits to liquid superheats,
rapid depressurization, and rainfall run-off, among other topics. His work on critical heat flux included centrifuge measurements of boiling at high gravity, some conducted for NASA.

Lienhard coauthored a textbook on statistical thermodynamics with Professor Chang-lin Tien (1971). He later wrote a textbook on heat transfer (1981) which went through a number of editions (1987, 2001, 2011, 2019), the last three coauthored with his eldest son, John H. Lienhard V. The heat transfer textbook has been available as a free ebook since 2001, one of the earliest textbooks to be distributed in this format.

Lienhard created the radio program The Engines of Our Ingenuity in January 1988.  He has written and voiced thousands of episodes in the decades since.  Lienhard's work on Engines has led to several books, in addition to the radio episodes.  The radio program is produced by KUHF in Houston and carried by National Public Radio.

The daily broadcasts of Engines of Our Ingenuity made Lienhard a sought-after public speaker. Over the three decades after Engines launched, Lienhard gave dozens of invited lectures each year, eventually totaling more than 1100 major addresses. He donated the honoraria from these talks to the University of Houston to create the Engines of Our Ingenuity undergraduate scholarship endowment.

Awards and recognition 
Lienhard was elected as Fellow of the American Society of Mechanical Engineers (ASME) in 1977 and as  Fellow of the American Association for the Advancement of Science in 1989. He was recognized with the Charles Russ Richards Medal of Pi Tau Sigma and ASME  in 1979, the ASME Heat Transfer Memorial Award in 1980, the ASME Ralph Coates Roe Medal in 1989 (for contributions to a public understanding of technology), the ASME Robert Henry Thurston Lecture Award in 1992, the ASEE Ralph Coates Roe Award in 1994, the ASME Engineer-Historian Award in 1998, and the ASME Edwin F. Church Medal in 2000.

ASME made Lienhard an Honorary Member in 1995.

Lienhard received a Doctorate in Humane Letters, honoris causa, from the University of Houston in 2002. Sacred Heart University awarded him an honorary doctorate in the same year.

Lienhard was elected to the US National Academy of Engineering in 2003 "for creating the awareness of engineering in the development of cultures and civilizations, and for the development of basic burnout theories in boiling and condensation".

List of books

 Chang-lin Tien and John H. Lienhard, Statistical Thermodynamics, Holt, Rinehart, and Winston, New York, 1971. (revised edition, Hemisphere-McGraw-Hill, Wash D.C., 1979)
 John H. Lienhard, A Heat Transfer Textbook, Prentice-Hall, Englewood Cliffs, N.J., 1981.
 John H. Lienhard, A Heat Transfer Textbook, 2nd ed. Prentice-Hall, Englewood Cliffs, N.J., 1987.
 History of Heat Transfer: Essays in Honor of the 50th Anniversary of the ASME Heat Transfer Division, (E. T. Layton and J. H. Lienhard, eds.), ASME, New York, 1988.
 John H. Lienhard, The engines of our ingenuity: an engineer looks at technology and culture, Oxford University Press, New York, 2000.
 John H. Lienhard, Inventing modern: an engineer looks for the twentieth century, Oxford University Press, New York, 2003. 
 John H. Lienhard, How invention begins: echoes of old voices in the rise of new machines, Oxford University Press, New York, 2008.
 John H. Lienhard, IV and John H. Lienhard, V A heat transfer textbook, 4th edition, Dover Publications, Mineola NY, 2011.
 John H. Lienhard, IV and John H. Lienhard, V A heat transfer textbook, 5th edition, Dover Publications, Mineola NY, 2019.

References

External links 
The Engines of Our Ingenuity website.
John H. Lienhard: Engineer, Educator, Communicator
A Heat Transfer Textbook, 5/e, free ebook.

1930 births
Living people
People from Saint Paul, Minnesota
American mechanical engineers
American radio hosts
University of Houston System people
Fellows of the American Society of Mechanical Engineers
Fellows of the American Association for the Advancement of Science
Oregon State University alumni
University of Washington alumni
University of California, Berkeley alumni